Joseph William Burton (born November 2, 1990) is an American professional basketball player for, who lastly played for Souffelweyersheim of the LNB Pro B. He played four seasons collegiate for the Oregon State Beavers men's basketball team. He usually plays as center or a power forward.

College career
Burton played collegiate for the Oregon State Beavers. He is a member of the Soboba Band of Luiseno Indians, one of the Luiseño Native American tribes of southern California. He became the first Native American man to earn a basketball scholarship at a Pac-10 Conference (now Pac-12) school. In Burton's senior year at college he averaged 11.0 ppg and 6.4 rpg in 32 games. He is the only Oregon State player to record over 1,000 points, 700 rebounds and 300 assists.

Professional career
Burton started his career in 2013 with Aalborg Vikings. In the Danish Basketligaen, Burton averaged 22 points, 12.5 rebounds and 4 assists.

For the 2014–15 season, Burton signed with Landstede Basketbal. At the end of the regular season, Burton won the DBL Statistical Player of the Year Award and was named to the All-DBL Team and DBL All-Defense Team.

For the 2015–16 season, Burton signed with ALM Évreux Basket. He was named the Most Valuable Player of the LNB Pro B.

On August 4, 2016, Burton signed with Chorale Roanne Basket, another club from the LNB Pro B.

On July 10, 2018, Burton signed with ADA Blois of the French first tier Pro A.

On August 13, 2019, he has signed with his old team Chorale Roanne Basket.

On August 17, 2020, he has signed with KTP Basket of the Finnish first tier Korisliiga

References

External links
Oregon State profile

1990 births
Living people
ADA Blois Basket 41 players
ALM Évreux Basket players
American expatriate basketball people in Denmark
American expatriate basketball people in France
American expatriate basketball people in Japan
American expatriate basketball people in the Netherlands
American men's basketball players
Aomori Wat's players
Basketball players from California
Centers (basketball)
Chorale Roanne Basket players
Dutch Basketball League players
Landstede Hammers players
Luiseño people
Native American basketball players
Oregon State Beavers men's basketball players
Power forwards (basketball)
Sportspeople from Riverside County, California
21st-century Native Americans
Black Native American people